The Magazine of Fantasy & Science Fiction (usually referred to as F&SF) is a U.S. fantasy and science-fiction magazine first published in 1949 by Mystery House, a subsidiary of Lawrence Spivak's Mercury Press.  Editors Anthony Boucher and J. Francis McComas had approached Spivak in the mid-1940s about creating a fantasy companion to Spivak's existing mystery title, Ellery Queen's Mystery Magazine.  The first issue was titled The Magazine of Fantasy, but the decision was quickly made to include science fiction as well as fantasy, and the title was changed correspondingly with the second issue.  F&SF was quite different in presentation from the existing science-fiction magazines of the day, most of which were in pulp format: it had no interior illustrations, no letter column, and text in a single-column format, which in the opinion of science-fiction historian Mike Ashley "set F&SF apart, giving it the air and authority of a superior magazine".

F&SF quickly became one of the leading magazines in the science-fiction and fantasy fields, with a reputation for publishing literary material and including more diverse stories than its competitors.  Well-known stories that appeared in its early years include Richard Matheson's "Born of Man and Woman", and Ward Moore's Bring the Jubilee, a novel of an alternative history in which the South has won the American Civil War.  McComas left for health reasons in 1954, but Boucher continued as sole editor until 1958, winning the Hugo Award for Best Magazine that year, a feat his successor, Robert Mills, repeated in the next two years.  Mills was responsible for publishing Flowers for Algernon by Daniel Keyes, Rogue Moon by Algis Budrys, Starship Troopers by Robert Heinlein, and the first of Brian Aldiss's Hothouse stories.  The first few issues mostly featured cover art by George Salter, Mercury Press's art director, but other artists soon began to appear, including Chesley Bonestell, Kelly Freas, and Ed Emshwiller.

In 1962, Mills was succeeded as editor by Avram Davidson.  When Davidson left at the end of 1964, Joseph Ferman, who had bought the magazine from Spivak in 1954, took over briefly as editor, though his son Edward soon began doing the editorial work under his father's supervision.  At the start of 1966, Edward Ferman was listed as editor, and four years later, he acquired the magazine from his father and moved the editorial offices to his house in Connecticut.  Ferman remained editor for over 25 years, and published many well-received stories, including Fritz Leiber's "Ill Met in Lankhmar", Robert Silverberg's "Born with the Dead", and Stephen King's The Dark Tower series.  In 1991, he turned the editorship over to Kristine Kathryn Rusch, who began including more horror and dark fantasy than had appeared under Ferman.  In the mid-1990s, circulation began to decline; most magazines were losing subscribers and F&SF was no exception.  Gordon Van Gelder replaced Rusch in 1997, and bought the magazine from Ferman in 2001, but circulation continued to fall, and by 2011, it was below 15,000.  Charles Coleman Finlay took over from Van Gelder as editor in 2015. Sheree Renée Thomas succeeded Charles Coleman Finlay, becoming the magazine's 10th editor in the fall of 2020.

Publication history

Lawrence Spivak 

The first magazine dedicated to fantasy, Weird Tales, appeared in 1923; it was followed in 1926 by Amazing Stories, the first science fiction (sf) magazine.  By the end of the 1930s, the genre was flourishing in the United States, nearly twenty new sf and fantasy titles appearing between 1938 and 1941.  These were all pulp magazines, which meant that despite the occasional high-quality story, most of the magazines presented badly written fiction and were regarded as trash by many readers.  In 1941, Ellery Queen's Mystery Magazine appeared, edited by Fred Dannay and focusing on detective fiction.  The magazine was published in digest format, rather than pulp, and printed a mixture of classic stories and fresh material.  Dannay attempted to avoid the sensationalist fiction appearing in the pulps, and soon made the magazine a success.

In the early 1940s Anthony Boucher, a successful writer of fantasy and sf and also of mystery stories, got to know Dannay through his work on the Ellery Queen radio show.  Boucher also knew J. Francis McComas, an editor who shared his interest in fantasy and SF.  By 1944 McComas and Boucher became interested in the idea of a fantasy companion to Ellery Queen's Mystery Magazine, and spoke to Dannay about it.  Dannay was interested in the idea, but paper was scarce because of World War II.  The following year Boucher and McComas suggested that the new magazine could use the Ellery Queen name, but Dannay knew little about fantasy and suggested instead that they approach Lawrence Spivak, the owner of Mercury Press, which published Ellery Queen's Mystery Magazine.

In January 1946, Boucher and McComas went to New York and met with Spivak, who let them know later in the year that he wanted to go ahead.  At Spivak's request they began acquiring material for the new magazine, including a new story by Raymond Chandler, and reprint rights to stories by H.P. Lovecraft, John Dickson Carr, and Robert Bloch.  Spivak initially planned the first issue (for which Boucher and McComas were proposing the title Fantasy and Horror) for early 1947, but repeatedly delayed the launch because of poor newsstand sales of digest magazines.  He also suggested that it should be priced at 35 cents an issue, which was higher than the original plan, to provide a financial buffer against poor sales.  In May 1949 Spivak suggested a new title, The Magazine of Fantasy, and in August a press release announced that the magazine would appear in October.  On October 6, 1949, Spivak, Boucher and McComas held a luncheon at the Waldorf-Astoria in New York City to commemorate the 100th anniversary of the death of Edgar Allan Poe and to launch "a new fantasy anthology periodical".  Invitees included Carr, Basil Rathbone, and Boris Karloff.

The first issue, published by Fantasy House, a subsidiary of American Mercury, sold 57,000 copies, which was less than Spivak had hoped for, but in November he gave Boucher and McComas the go-ahead for another issue.  The title was changed to The Magazine of Fantasy & Science Fiction (almost always abbreviated to F&SF by both fans and science fiction historians) to reflect the contents.  Sales of the second issue were strong enough for Spivak to commit further, and the magazine's future became more assured, despite the difficulties caused by the fact that both Boucher and McComas lived on the west coast, whereas the magazine's publishing offices were in New York.  The publishing schedule moved to bimonthly with the December 1950 issue.  The pay rate for the early issues was two cents per word, or $100 for short pieces, which was competitive with Astounding Science Fiction, the leading sf magazine of the day.  By 1953 the rates had changed to three-and-a-half cents per word for stories under 3,000 words.

In 1951, McComas, who had a full-time job in sales on top of his role as editor of F&SF, was forced to reduce his workload for health reasons.  Boucher then did most of the reading and editing, while McComas reviewed the results and occasionally vetoed a story.  In August the following year the schedule switched to monthly.  In 1954 Spivak sold his shares in Mercury Press to his general manager, Joseph Ferman; that year also saw McComas's departure—his health had deteriorated to the point where he had to give up the editing post completely.

The Fermans and Gordon Van Gelder 

In 1957 Ferman launched a companion magazine, Venture Science Fiction, which was intended to focus on more action-oriented fiction than F&SF.  Boucher was unable to take on the extra work, so Robert P. Mills, who had been the managing editor for F&SF, became Ventures editor, with Boucher in an advisory role.  Later that year Ferman sold Ellery Queen's Mystery Magazine to Bernard Davis, who was leaving Ziff-Davis to start his own publishing venture.  Ferman retained F&SF, though Boucher departed, and Mills became the editor of F&SF while remaining managing editor of Queen's magazine.  Mills stayed for over three years, leaving at the end of 1961 to spend more time working as a literary agent, and Ferman replaced him with Avram Davidson, whose name first appeared on the masthead with the April 1962 issue.  Joseph Ferman's son Edward had worked for the magazine as an editorial assistant in the 1950s, but left in 1959 to gain experience elsewhere; he returned in 1962, and worked under Davidson as managing editor.  In 1963 Ted White, later the editor of Amazing Stories, became assistant editor, and stayed with the magazine until 1968.

Davidson gave up the editor's chair in late 1964 in order to have more time to write, and was initially replaced by Joseph Ferman, who handed over control to his son Edward from May 1965, though the masthead did not reflect the change till 1966.  Four years later the younger Ferman took over from his father as publisher as well, and moved the editorial and publishing offices to his house in Cornwall, Connecticut.  His wife, Audrey, was business manager, and Andrew Porter was an assistant editor.  In the early 1970s Ferman contacted Sol Cohen, the owner of Amazing Stories and Fantastic Stories, two competing sf magazines, about purchasing them both.  Ferman was considering combining them into a single magazine and publishing them alongside F&SF, but Cohen decided to keep both titles.

In 1969, an issue of F&SF was priced at 50 cents; by the end of the 1970s the price had gone up to $1.25, although the page count also rose, from 128 to 160 pages.  Circulation did not suffer, but rose from 50,000 to over 60,000, partly because of subscription drives through Publishers' Clearing House, and perhaps also because the magazine's quality remained consistent throughout the decade.  In Ashley's words, "F&SF delivered the goods month after month": the schedule was reliable, the format remained unchanged, and the editor remained the same from 1965 throughout the next two decades and more.  Ferman managed to keep the circulation above 50,000, and sometimes above 60,000, during the 1980s when most other magazines were losing subscribers.  He turned over the editorship to Kristine Kathryn Rusch in 1991, and by the mid-1990s circulation began to fall again.  In 1997 Gordon Van Gelder took over as editor, and from the February 2001 issue was publisher as well, having bought the magazine from Ferman.  John Joseph Adams was Van Gelder's assistant editor from 2001 until December 2009.  Van Gelder was unable to arrest the decline in circulation, which by 2011 was down to less than 15,000.  Van Gelder reduced the publication frequency to bimonthly, increasing the page count and price.  Charles Coleman Finlay guest-edited the July/August 2014 issue, and was hired in 2015 as full-time editor, beginning with the March/April 2015 issue.  Sheree Renée Thomas was hired as editor, beginning with the March/April 2021 issue.

Contents and reception

Boucher, McComas, Mills and Davidson 
Boucher and McComas's original goal for the new magazine was to imitate the formula that had made Ellery Queen's Mystery Magazine successful: classic reprints, along with quality fiction that avoided the excesses of the pulps.  The initial proposal called for the magazine to include fantasy, but not science fiction.  Even before the launch, the editors found they were having trouble deciding exactly where the boundary lay, so when in February 1949 Joseph Ferman, Spivak's general manager, asked them to add sf to the lineup as a way to broaden the readership, they were happy to comply.  The first issue included only one story that could be called science fiction: Theodore Sturgeon's "The Hurkle Is a Happy Beast"; it also included reprints from the slick magazines by writers such as Richard Sale, and Guy Endore.  The interior layout was quite different from the existing fantasy and sf magazines: there were no interior illustrations, and the text was printed in a single column, instead of two as was usual elsewhere.  There was a book review column, but no letters page.  According to sf historian Mike Ashley, this "set F&SF apart, giving it the air and authority of a superior magazine".  The logo design and layout were the work of Mercury Press's art director, George Salter, whose background was in book design rather than in pulp magazines.  Salter remained with the magazine until 1958.  He was responsible for many of the surreal early covers; these gave way to work by other artists, but his design for F&SF remained intact for decades, and in Ashley's opinion the consistency of appearance has been "one of the major selling points" of the magazine.

When the second issue appeared, with the title revised to include "Science Fiction", there was no announcement of the change, and not much more science fiction than in the first issue.  Damon Knight contributed one example, "Not with a Bang", which Knight has described as his first fully professional story.  The next issue included Richard Matheson's first sale, "Born of Man and Woman", widely considered one of the finest stories F&SF ever published.  Over the next few years several writers became strongly associated with the magazine, including Margaret St. Clair, Reginald Bretnor, Miriam Allen deFord, and Zenna Henderson, and Boucher was also able to attract some of the best-known established names, such as Arthur C. Clarke, Fritz Leiber, and Ray Bradbury.  Fletcher Pratt and L. Sprague de Camp began their "Gavagan's Bar" series of stories in the first issue of F&SF, and Manly Wade Wellman published the first of his "John the Balladeer" stories in the December 1951 issue.  The focus was on short fiction; serials and novels were mainly avoided.  One exception was Ward Moore's Bring the Jubilee, an alternative history set in a world where the South wins the American Civil War.  Boucher bought "A Canticle for Leibowitz" from Walter M. Miller, who had been unable to sell it elsewhere, and printed it in the April 1955 issue; it was the first story in the series that would become the novel of the same name, and has since become recognized as a classic of the genre.

A controversial article by the astronomer R.S. Richardson titled "The Day After We Land on Mars" appeared in the December 1955 issue; Richardson commented that an exploration of other worlds would require "the men stationed on a planet [to be] openly accompanied by women to relieve the sexual tensions that develop among normal healthy males".  Responses by Poul Anderson and Miriam Allen deFord appeared in F&SF the following year.  DeFord argued that Richardson was assuming that women were not people in the same way as men, and the controversy has since been cited as part of the long debate within the genre about the image of women in science fiction.

In 1958 F&SF won its first Hugo Award for Best Magazine, and when Mills became editor that year he maintained the high standards Boucher had set, winning the award again in 1959 and 1960.  Mills continued to publish a broad range of material without limiting the magazine to particular subgenres.  Ashley cites John Collier, Robert Arthur, Allen Drury, and Ray Bradbury, all authors with mainstream reputations who appeared in F&SF in 1960, as evidence of the magazine's diversity.  Daniel Keyes had been unable to sell "Flowers for Algernon" until Mills bought it in 1959; it went on to win several awards and according to Clute and Nicholls is "arguably the most popular sf novel ever published".  Rogue Moon, a novel about a deadly artifact left by aliens on the moon, is often considered Algis Budrys's best novel; it appeared in 1960, and the following year saw Brian Aldiss's "Hothouse", the first in that series. (Budrys later said that what he described as the "cuteness of the early F&SF school of editing—and its open contempt for the accomplishments of the Campbellian school" had resulted in "buckets and buckets of froth" but, more favorably, "Liberal Arts concepts in what had been almost exclusively a B. S. field".) Zenna Henderson's stories of The People, a group of refugee humanoid aliens hiding on Earth, were published through the 1950s and 1960s and became a "central feature" of the magazine according to sf critic John Clute.  Boucher published Damon Knight's "The Country of the Kind", described by Ashley as "one of his most potent stories from the fifties", in 1956, and the same year, under the pseudonym "Grendel Briarton", Reginald Bretnor began a series of punning stories known as "Feghoots" that lasted until 1964.  At the end of the 1950s, during Mills' tenure as editor, Robert Heinlein's Starship Troopers was serialized in F&SF, under the title Starship Soldier; this was intended to be a juvenile novel but was rejected by Scribner's for being too violent.  It won the Hugo Award in the novel category the following year, and proved to be one of Heinlein's most controversial books.

Among the cover artists in the first decade, sf historian and critic Thomas Clareson singles out the early astronomical scenes by Chesley Bonestell as being the most notable; these were among the first to replace George Salter's surreal artwork on the cover.  Kelly Freas and Ed Emshwiller, two of the most popular artists in the sf field, also contributed covers during the 1950s.  Mel Hunter began contributing covers with the November 1953 issue, and in October 1955 began a long-running series of covers that depicted a robot survivor of a nuclear holocaust engaging in human activities amidst the desolation—watering a flower, playing with toys, or reading a store catalog, for example.  A regular book review column appeared, titled "Recommended Reading"; it was signed simply "The Editors" until McComas ceased to be one of the co-editors, after which Boucher used his own name.  According to Clareson, the column "long remained the most catholic appraisal of the field" because of the variety of works reviewed.  Boucher did not review his own fiction in the column, though on at least one occasion he listed a new book of his, telling the reader: "Comments eagerly welcomed; in this case, you are the reviewer".  When Boucher left, he was succeeded by Damon Knight as book reviewer; Alfred Bester took over in 1960 and remained in the role until Avram Davidson became the book reviewer when he took the editorial chair.  Isaac Asimov had begun a series of science articles for Venture Science Fiction in January 1958, and when Venture was cancelled Mills brought the science column over to F&SF. The column, which according to Asimov he enjoyed writing more than any of his other works, ran for decades without interruption, helping to contribute to a long-standing feeling of consistency and continuity in F&SFs format and contents.

Avram Davidson, who became editor in 1962, had sold his first story to F&SF in 1954, though he was better remembered for "The Golem", which appeared in the March 1955 issue.  Under Davidson more work appeared by non-English-speaking writers such as Hugo Correa, Herbert Franke, and Shin'ishi Hoshi.  Notable stories he acquired for F&SF include Terry Carr's first sale, "Who Sups with the Devil?", in 1962, and Roger Zelazny's "A Rose for Ecclesiastes" in November 1963.  He published two "author special" issues: Theodore Sturgeon was featured in the September 1962 issue, and Ray Bradbury in May 1963.  These author issues, which had been Joseph Ferman's idea, became a regular feature, with subsequent issues featuring Isaac Asimov (October 1966), Fritz Leiber (July 1969), Poul Anderson (April 1971), James Blish (April 1972), Frederik Pohl (September 1973), Robert Silverberg (April 1974), Damon Knight (November 1976), Harlan Ellison (July 1977), Stephen King (December 1990), Lucius Shepard (March 2001), Kate Wilhelm (September 2001), Barry N. Malzberg (June 2003), Gene Wolfe (April 2007), and David Gerrold (September/October 2016).

Edward Ferman 
Joseph Ferman's son, Edward Ferman, was managing editor during Davidson's tenure as editor.  When Davidson left, Joseph Ferman took over the editorial chair, but in reality Edward Ferman was doing all the editorial work, and by the May 1965 issue was in full control of the magazine.  It remained eclectic through the 1960s and 1970s, publishing work by New Wave writers such as Thomas Disch and John Sladek, along with new US writers such as Samuel Delany and Roger Zelazny, hard science fiction stories by Gregory Benford and John Varley, fantasies by Sterling Lanier and Tom Reamy, and horror by Charles L. Grant and Stephen King.  The mid-1960s saw an increase in the diversity of stories appearing elsewhere in the field; magazines like New Worlds and Science Fantasy published material that previously could only have appeared in F&SF.  Sf author Christopher Priest, writing in 1978, commented that many writers later considered part of the New Wave soon found "a natural home for their work" in F&SF.  In Ashley's view the rest of the field was starting to catch up to F&SFs open-mindedness, but this did not lead to a drop in F&SFs quality; the end of the 1960s saw Ferman printing some old-fashioned material such as John Christopher's novel about miniaturization, The Little People, alongside much of Roger Zelazny's early output, and "anarchic and often indefinable" stories by R.A. Lafferty, Harvey Jacobs, and others.  In 1968, Piers Anthony's early novel Sos the Rope was serialized; Anthony had won a competition sponsored in part by F&SF.

Harlan Ellison and James Tiptree, Jr. were frequent contributors in the 1970s, Tiptree contributing some of her best-known stories, such as "And I Awoke and Found Me Here on the Cold Hill's Side" and "The Women Men Don't See"; Ellison's many stories in F&SF included "The Deathbird", in 1973, which won a Hugo Award, and "Jeffty Is Five" in 1977, which won both a Hugo and a Nebula Award.  Other award-winning stories from Ferman's first decade and a half included Fritz Leiber's "Ship of Shadows" in 1969, "Ill Met in Lankhmar" in 1970, and "Catch That Zeppelin" in 1975; all three won Hugos, and the latter two also won Nebulas.  Poul Anderson's "The Queen of Air and Darkness" won both a Hugo and a Nebula, Robert Silverberg's "Born with the Dead" won a Nebula, and Frederik Pohl's novel of Martian colonization, Man Plus, also won a Nebula.

Judith Merril took over the book review column on Davidson's departure, and was followed by James Blish in 1970 and Algis Budrys in 1975, with frequent contributions from other reviewers such as Joanna Russ and Gahan Wilson.  In 1965 Wilson began contributing cartoons, and continued to do so regularly until 1981.  Ferman set a humorous competition for the readers in the November 1971 issue, and thereafter ran two or three similar competitions every year.  These were later collected in a 1996 anthology, titled Oi, Robot, the title taken from a competition to add a single letter to a well-known work of SF.  A film review column, the first in the magazine since Charles Beaumont's "The Science Screen" (and "William Morrison" aka Joseph Samachson's live-theater column "The Science Stage") in the latter 1950s, conducted by Samuel R. Delany, commenced in 1969; Baird Searles contributed the column between 1970 and 1984.  Among the later reviewers, Ellison was one of the most popular, and columns from his first four years were collected as Harlan Ellison's Watching in 1989.

Isaac Asimov's Science Fiction Magazine was launched in 1977 and from 1983, under the editorships of Shawna McCarthy and later Gardner Dozois, it began to publish more mature material, becoming a more direct competitor to F&SFs market niche.  Authors such as Lucius Shepard, James Blaylock, and John Crowley, whose work was a natural fit for F&SF, were selling to Asimovs as well.  The launch of Omni in 1978 also had an impact.  For almost every year in the 1970s stories published in F&SF won more award nominations, and were selected for more "Year's Best" anthologies, than the other magazines; in the 1980s that was no longer true, as Asimov's took over the leading role, and Omni sometimes pushed F&SF into third place.  Ferman was still able to acquire some highly regarded material, such as "Lost Boys" by Orson Scott Card, and Kirinyaga by Mike Resnick.  When Omni rejected George R.R. Martin's "Monkey Treatment" and Gardner Dozois's "Down Among the Dead Men", which were dark fantasy, Ferman acquired both.  Along with these regular columns, Ferman occasionally published articles, such as "Science Fiction and the University", a feature in the May 1972 issue that included contributions from Darko Suvin, Thomas Clareson, and Philip Klass.

F&SF won the Hugo Award for Best Magazine for four consecutive years, from 1969 through 1972, when the award was changed to "Best Professional Editor".  Initially this category was dominated by Ben Bova, the editor of Analog, but Ferman won it for three more years at the start of the 1980s.

Some of the artists who had provided covers for early issues of F&SF, including Chesley Bonestell, Ed Emshwiller, and Alex Schomburg, were still contributing their work into the late 1970s, and many of the regular writers from the early years, such as Reginald Bretnor, Ron Goulart, and Hilbert Schenck, continued to appear in F&SF into the 1980s.  A newer group, including Joanna Russ and R.A. Lafferty, had become regulars more recently.  Some established writers such as Thomas Disch published their more unusual work in F&SF, and there were also writers such as Felix C. Gotschalk, whose unusual stories were described by Ferman as "a step ahead of most sf writers (or perhaps he's marching in a different direction)".  In Ashley's opinion, Ferman managed to "balance the work of these eccentric writers so that they never distorted the contents yet kept the magazine on the edge".

Newer writers who began to appear regularly in the 1980s included Bruce Sterling, who published his early Shaper/Mechanist stories in F&SF, beginning with "Swarm", in 1982.  Stephen King's "The Dark Tower" series had begun in 1979 in F&SF, and four more stories appeared over the next three years before being collected as a novel in 1982; and Michael Shea and Bob Leman contributed horror and weird fiction regularly in the 1980s.  Despite the increased competition from Omni and Isaac Asimov's Science Fiction Magazine, Ferman managed to keep F&SFs reputation for quality intact throughout the 1980s; it was not as distinct from its competition as it had once been, but it retained an "idiosyncratic individuality", in Ashley's words.

After Ferman 
Under Kristine Kathryn Rusch F&SF began to publish more dark fantasy and horror stories, such as "The Night We Buried Road Dog" by Jack Cady, which won a Nebula Award.  When Rusch took over as editor, Isaac Asimov had been writing the science column for over three decades, and Algis Budrys had been contributing a book review column since 1975; in 1992 Asimov died and Budrys departed.  The science column ran for 399 consecutive issues, ending in February 1992.  Asimov's widow, Janet Asimov, wrote another essay for the December 1994 issue, based on her conversations with her husband before his death, and a final essay appeared in January 1996, containing material from the book Yours, Isaac Asimov: A Lifetime of Letters.  The science column continued to appear, written by Bruce Sterling and Gregory Benford among others, and John Kessel took over the book reviews; Robert Killheffer succeeded Kessel, with some overlap in 1994 and 1995.  Asimov's maintained its dominance of the field through the 1990s, though Rusch published well-received material such as "The Martian Child" by David Gerrold and "Last Summer at Mars Hill" by Elizabeth Hand.  Rusch won one Hugo Award as editor during her five years at F&SF, in 1994.

Van Gelder printed more fantasy and less hard science fiction than had Rusch, and in Ashley's opinion he was able to "restore some of the magazine's distinctiveness".  As a result of the switch to bimonthly in 2009, with the resulting higher page count in each issue, the magazine began to publish longer stories.

Assessment 
F&SF quickly established itself as one of the leading magazines.  Ashley describes it as bridging "the attitude gap between the slick magazines and the pulps"', and argues that it made the genre more respectable.  The fantasy side of the magazine attracted writers who had been regular contributors to Weird Tales and Unknown, two of the best-known fantasy pulps, and in Ashley's opinion, it soon found a "middle ground" between those pulp traditions and fantasy written for the slicks.  It was known as the most literary of the science fiction and fantasy magazines, and it published the most diverse range of material.  In a 1978 review of New Wave SF, Christopher Priest agreed that F&SF has a bias for literary work, and added that "it has been a sort of New Wave of its own ever since its inception".

From the 1950s, F&SF was regarded as one of the "big three" science fiction magazines, along with Astounding Science Fiction and Galaxy Science Fiction.  In a review of a 1952 issue, James Blish (writing as William Atheling, Jr.) commented that much of the magazine to that point was wonderfully written, and that Boucher's and McComas's editorial acumen made F&SF very readable, but that on occasion a well-written, sophisticated, but unoriginal science fiction story might be accepted by F&SF because it was not a specialist sf magazine.  At the end of the 1950s Kingsley Amis described it as "the most highbrow" of the science fiction magazines, and Gary K. Wolfe later said that F&SF, along with Galaxy, "defined the tenor" of the 1950s.  In 1966, Judith Merril argued that it was Boucher and McComas who made a place in the genre for writers such as Charles Beaumont, Mildred Clingerman, Edgar Pangborn, and many others who, in her opinion, had "virtually stopped writing until the necessary new magazine came along".

In 2007, Ashley commented that F&SF had been "the most consistently enjoyable magazine of the last 50 years".  In his view, a key reason for the magazine's appeal was that its roots were in the literary tradition, with Lawrence Spivak, its first publisher, the inheritor of H.L. Mencken's American Mercury, which had been successful and widely respected as a literary review.  Unlike most of its competitors, F&SF had no connection to the pulp magazine era, and its editors had always intended to appeal to readers of books, rather than of magazines.  Ashley also cites F&SFs broad editorial policy, which allowed the magazine to carry a wider range of fiction than its competitors.  In 2014 Gary Westfahl praised the "creative editors of the 1980s and 1990s, such as Gardner Dozois ... and Gordon Van Gelder", but added that "such editors were no longer the most important figures in the field".

Bibliographic details 

As of March 2017, the editorial succession is as follows:
Anthony Boucher & J. Francis McComas, Fall 1949 – August 1954
Anthony Boucher, September 1954 – August 1958
Robert P. Mills, September 1958 – March 1962
Avram Davidson, April 1962 – November 1964
Joseph W. Ferman, December 1964 – December 1965
Edward L. Ferman, January 1966 – June 1991
Kristine Kathryn Rusch, July 1991 – May 1997
Gordon Van Gelder, June 1997 – January 2015
Charles Coleman Finlay, March/April 2015 – January 2021
Sheree Renée Thomas, March/April 2021 - present. 
The first issue was titled The Magazine of Fantasy; with the second issue the title switched to The Magazine of Fantasy & Science Fiction.  It has been in digest format since the beginning.

The publisher was initially Fantasy House, a subsidiary of Mercury Press; from March 1958 the publisher was listed as Mercury Press instead.  Since February 2001 the publisher has been Van Gelder's Spilogale, Inc.

The following table lists F&SFs prices over the years.  When Joseph Ferman announced the price change in the February 1959 issue, his justification for the increase was that "during the past ten years...paper costs have gone up by 38%, composition, printing, binding and handling costs have gone up by 32%, postages costs have gone up from 33% to 60%, and various other costs have risen as much or more".

Anthologies 
The following anthologies of fiction from F&SF have appeared.

In 1981, Martin H. Greenberg edited a hardcover facsimile edition of the April 1965 issue of F&SF, with the addition of an introduction by Edward Ferman, and memoirs by the authors whose work appeared in the issue.  The book was published by Southern Illinois University Press.

Overseas editions 
F&SF has had multiple foreign editions, including:
 Argentina.  Minotauro (September 1964 – June 1968), edited by Francisco Porrúa under the alias Ricardo Gosseyn, and published by Ediciones Minotauro, Buenos Aires.  Ten issues.  The full title was Minotauro fantasía y ciencia-ficción.  Minotauro did not reprint individual issues of F&SF; instead each issue was filled with stories selected from various issues of F&SF.  Also La revista de ciencia ficción y fantasía (October 1976 – February 1977), edited by Marcial Souto and published by Ediciones Orión.  Three issues.  This was primarily a reprint edition of F&SF but also published some original material.
 Australia.  The Magazine of Fantasy & Science Fiction (November 1954 – August 1958), published by Consolidated Press as a saddle-stapled digest.  14 issues.  The first six issues were 128 pages long, the next 4 were 112 pages, and the last four were 96 pages.  It was priced at 2/- throughout.  The contents were selected from the US magazine but the Australian issues did not correspond to individual issues of the original.
 Brazil.  Galáxia 2000 (first issue January 1968), edited by Mario Camarinha, and published by Ediçōes O Cruzeiro.  Four or five issues.  This contains reprints from not only the US edition of F&SF, but also from the French, Italian and Argentinian versions.  This was followed in 1970 by another Magazine de Ficçāo Cientifica, which appeared in April 1970.  The editor was initially Jerônymo Monteiro; he died after two issues and was succeeded by his daughter, Theresa Monteiro.  The publisher was Revista do Globo.  The magazine ran from April 1970 to November 1971, publishing a total of 20 issues, each containing a story by a local writer along with the reprinted material.
 France.  Fiction (October 1953 – February 1990), edited by Alain Dorémieux for most of its existence.  412 issues.  Fiction included original French stories as well as translations from the English version of the magazine, and occasionally these French stories subsequently appeared in F&SF, translated into English.  One example is "Les Premiers jour de mai" by Claude Veillot, which appeared in Fiction in May 1960 and then as "The First Days of May" in F&SF in December 1961, translated by Damon Knight.  Since 2005 it has been issued twice a year as a magazine/anthology series.
 Germany.  A series of anthologies titled Magazine of Fantasy and Science Fiction began appearing in Germany in 1963, published by Heyne, and lasted until issue 101, which appeared in 2000.  These contained stories selected from F&SF.  The editor was Charlotte Winheller for issues 1–9; Walter Ernsting for issues 10–14; Wulf H. Bergner for issues 15–42; Manfred Kluge for issues 43–63; and Ronald M. Hahn thereafter.  The full title of the publication was initially "Eine Auswahl der besten SF-Stories aus The Magazine of Fantasy and Science Fiction"; later titles include "Die besten SF-Stories aus The Magazine of Fantasy and Science Fiction" and "Die besten Stories aus The Magazine of Fantasy and Science Fiction".
 Israel.  Fantasia 2000 (December 1978 – 1984), edited by Aharon Hauptman and Gabi Peleg; published by A. Tene for the first 15 issues, and thereafter by Hyperion.  44 issues.  Most of Fantasia 2000s contents were translations of material that had originally appeared in F&SF, along with some original stories by Israelis.  It included translations of Asimov's science column, and also included departments that did not originate in F&SF, such as a letters page and non-fiction articles.
 Italy.  Fantascienza (November 1954 – May 1955), edited by Livio Garzanti, published by Garzanti e i Fratelli Treves.  7 issues.  Reprints of issues of F&SF.  Also Fantasia & Fantascienza (December 1962 – October 1963), edited by G. Jori, published by Minerva Editrice.  10 monthly issues, omitting May 1963.  A reprint of F&SF, but it included some original material as well. Another series of reprints was published by Elara from 2013 to 2017, for a total of 17 issues with irregular periodicity.
 Japan.  SF Magazine (February 1960 – current as of 2017), edited by (among others) Masami Fukushima, Ryozo Nagashima, and Imaoka Kiyoshi.  This began as a reprint edition of F&SF, but soon began printing more original fiction, and as of 2016 is the leading Japanese science fiction magazine, publishing both original material and stories reprinted from a variety of sources.
 Mexico.  Ciencia y Fantasía (September 1955 – December 1957), editor unknown, published by Novaro-México, S.A.  14 issues.  Reprinted from F&SF by selecting stories from different issues of the original magazine.
 Norway.  Nova (1971–1979), edited by Terje Wanberg, Øyvind Myhre, Per G. Olson, and Johannes H. Berg, published by Stowa Forlag.  34 issues.  Initially titled Science Fiction-Magasinet, it began by reprinting from F&SF; from the fourth issue it began to feature new material.
 Sweden.  Jules Verne Magasinet (1969–2013), edited and published by Bertil Falk (1969–1971); edited by Sam Lundwall (1972–2013) and published by Askild & Kärnekull (1972), Delta (1973–1983), and Sam J Lundwall Fakta & Fantasi (1983–2010).  Starting with the Askild & Kärnekull issues, and until at least the mid-1980s, this contained a large proportion of reprints from F&SF, along with some original material from other sources.
 United Kingdom.  Two series, both titled The Magazine of Fantasy & Science Fiction.  The first series was published by Mellifont Press, and ran from October 1953 to September 1954, in digest format, with 128 pages, priced at 1/6.  The contents were taken from the U.S. magazine, but the UK issues did not directly correspond to individual U.S. issues.  The second series was published by Atlas Publishing & Distributing from December 1959 to June 1964, in digest format.  All issues were 128 pages except for January 1961 through November 1961 and March 1962 through June 1964, which were 112 pages.  The price was 2/- from until November 1961, and 2/6 from December 1961 until the end of the run.  As with the first series the reprint issues did not exactly correspond to individual U.S. issues.  After the second series ended, some additional material from the U.S. issues was reprinted in the UK edition of Venture Science Fiction.

See also

Notes

References

Sources

External links 
 
 Archive index of the former official site, www.sfsite.com/fsf/
 The Magazine of Fantasy and Science Fiction (UK) July 1961—Internet Archive Python Library 1.0.10

 
1949 establishments in the United States
Bimonthly magazines published in the United States
Fantasy fiction magazines
Horror fiction magazines
Magazines established in 1949
Magazines published in Connecticut
Magazines published in New Jersey
Magazines published in New York City
Science fiction digests
Science fiction magazines established in the 1940s
Science fiction magazines published in the United States